Oxygen evolution is the process of generating molecular oxygen (O2) by a chemical reaction, usually from water. Oxygen evolution from water is effected by oxygenic photosynthesis, electrolysis of water, and thermal decomposition of various oxides.  The biological process supports aerobic life.  When relatively pure oxygen is required industrially, it is isolated by distilling liquefied air.

Oxygen evolution in nature

Photosynthetic oxygen evolution is the fundamental process by which oxygen is generated in the earth's biosphere. The reaction is part of the light-dependent reactions of photosynthesis in cyanobacteria and the chloroplasts of green algae and plants. It utilizes the energy of light to split a water molecule into its protons and electrons for photosynthesis. Free oxygen, generated as a by-product of this reaction, is released into the atmosphere.

Water oxidation is catalyzed by a manganese-containing cofactor contained in photosystem II, known as the oxygen-evolving complex (OEC) or the water-splitting complex. Manganese is an important cofactor, and calcium and chloride are also required for the reaction to occur. The stoichiometry of this reaction is as follows:
 2H2O ⟶ 4e− + 4H+ + O2
The protons are released into the thylakoid lumen, thus contributing to the generation of a proton gradient across the thylakoid membrane. This proton gradient is the driving force for adenosine triphosphate (ATP) synthesis via photophosphorylation and the coupling of the absorption of light energy and the oxidation of water for the creation of chemical energy during photosynthesis.

History of discovery
It was not until the end of the 18th century that Joseph Priestley accidentally discovered the ability of plants to "restore" air that had been "injured" by the burning of a candle. He followed up on the experiment by showing that air "restored" by vegetation was "not at all inconvenient to a mouse." He was later awarded a medal for his discoveries that "...no vegetable grows in vain... but cleanses and purifies our atmosphere." Priestley's experiments were further evaluated by Jan Ingenhousz, a Dutch physician, who then showed that the "restoration" of air only worked while in the presence of light and green plant parts.

Water electrolysis
Together with hydrogen (H2), oxygen is evolved by the electrolysis of water. The point of water electrolysis is to store energy in the form of hydrogen gas, a clean-burning fuel. The "oxygen evolution reaction (OER) is the major bottleneck [to water electrolysis] due to the sluggish kinetics of this four-electron transfer reaction."  All practical catalysts are heterogeneous.

Electrons (e−) are transferred from the cathode to protons to form hydrogen gas. The half reaction, balanced with acid, is:
2 H+ + 2e−   →  H2

At the positively charged anode, an oxidation reaction occurs, generating oxygen gas and releasing electrons to the anode to complete the circuit:
2 H2O  →   O2  +  4 H+  +  4e−

Combining either half reaction pair yields the same overall decomposition of water into oxygen and hydrogen:

Overall reaction: 
2 H2O   →   2 H2  + O2

Chemical oxygen generation
Although some metal oxides eventually release O2 when heated, these conversions generally require high temperatures.  A few compounds release O2 at mild temperatures. Chemical oxygen generators consist of chemical compounds that release O2 when stimulated, usually by heat. They are used in submarines and commercial aircraft to provide emergency oxygen.  Oxygen is generated by the high-temperature decomposition of sodium chlorate:
2 NaClO3  →  2 NaCl  +  3 O2
Potassium permanganate also releases oxygen upon heating, but the yield is modest.
2 KMnO4  →  MnO2  +  K2MnO4  +  O2

See also 
 Great Oxygenation Event

References

External links
Plant Physiology Online, 4th edition: Topic 7.7 - Oxygen Evolution
Oxygen evolution - Lecture notes by Antony Crofts, UIUC
Evolution of the atmosphere – Lecture notes, Regents of the University of Michigan
How to make oxygen and hydrogen from water using electrolysis

Photosynthesis
Breathing gases
Oxygen
Biological evolution